The 2011 Minnesota Twins season was the 51st season for the franchise in Minnesota, and the 111th overall in the American League. The team drew 3,168,107 fans during the year.  The Twins had a poor season, falling from first place the year before to last in 2011.

Regular season

Longtime Twins pitcher and broadcaster Bert Blyleven was elected to the Hall of Fame on January 5, and inducted on July 24.

On May 3, on a 42-degree Chicago Tuesday night, Francisco Liriano hurled the Twins' fifth no-hitter, closing down the White Sox.  He struck out two and walked six on 123 pitches, but won 1-0.  Liriano's gem follows previous no-hitters by Jack Kralick (1962), Dean Chance (1967), Scott Erickson (1994) and Eric Milton (1999). To date, the Twins have been no-hit four times in their history.

The Twins opened their June 21 game against the San Francisco Giants and Madison Bumgarner with four singles and four doubles.  The eight consecutive hits to open a game tied a major league record. After Ben Revere collected his second hit of the inning, Bumgarner was lifted.

Only Michael Cuddyer represented the Twins at the All-Star Game.  As a reserve outfielder, he was inserted at first base for two innings and went 0 for 1.

Slugger Jim Thome belted career homers number 599 and 600 on August 15.  He was just the eighth player in history to reach 600.  Six days later at Target Field, Thome on the diamond with New York's Alex Rodriguez marked the first time since July 17, 1973 that two 600-home-run club members squared off—on that date it was Willie Mays and Hank Aaron.

A Twins first happened on September 6, when Chris Parmelee, Joe Benson and Liam Hendriks each made their major league debut in the same game.  Starting pitcher Hendriks took the loss, striking out 4 but giving up four hits and all three Chicago White Sox runs.  Parmelee's 2-for-4 night topped Benson's 0-for 3.

At season's end, closer Joe Nathan finished with 260 Minnesota saves, topping Rick Aguilera's club record of 254.  Nathan signed as a free agent with the Texas Rangers in November.

Season standings

Record vs opponents

Roster

Game log 

|-  style="text-align:center; background:#fbb;"
| 1 || April 1 || @ Blue Jays || 13–3 || Romero (1–0) || Pavano (0–1) || || 47,984 || 0–1 
|- style="text-align:center; background:#fbb;"
| 2 || April 2 || @ Blue Jays || 6–1 || Drabek (1–0) || Liriano (0–1) || || 27,194 || 0–2
|- style="text-align:center; background:#bfb;"
| 3 || April 3 || @ Blue Jays || 4–3 ||Blackburn (1–0) || Cecil (0–1) || Nathan (1) || 35,505 || 1–2
|- style="text-align:center; background:#fbb;"
| 4 || April 4 || @ Yankees || 4–3 || Nova (1–0) || Baker (0–1) || Rivera (3) || 40,311 || 1–3
|- style="text-align:center; background:#bfb;"
| 5 || April 5 || @ Yankees || 5–4 (10) || Capps (1–0) || Logan (0–1) || Nathan (2) || 40,267 || 2–3
|- style="text-align:center; background:#bbb;"
|   || April 6 || @ Yankees || colspan=6 | Postponed (rain); Makeup: 9/19
|- style="text-align:center; background:#fbb;"
| 6 || April 7 || @ Yankees || 4–3 || Burnett (2–0) || Liriano (0–2) || Rivera (4) || 41,512 || 2–4
|- style="text-align:center; background:#bfb;"
| 7 || April 8 || Athletics || 2–1 || Pavano (1–1) || Anderson (0–1) || Nathan (3) || 40,714 || 3–4
|- style="text-align:center; background:#fbb;"
| 8 || April 9 || Athletics || 1–0 || Gonzalez (2–0) || Blackburn (1–1) || Fuentes (2) || 39,936 || 3–5
|- style="text-align:center; background:#fbb;"
| 9 || April 10 || Athletics || 5–3 || McCarthy (1–0) || Baker (0–2) || Fuentes (3) || 38,484 || 3–6
|- style="text-align:center; background:#bfb;"
| 10 || April 12 || Royals || 4–3 (10) || Hughes (1–0) || Tejeda (0–1) || || 38,154 || 4–6
|- style="text-align:center; background:#fbb;"
| 11 || April 13 || Royals || 10–5 || Davies (1–0) || Liriano (0–3) || Jeffress (1) || 36,286 || 4–7
|- style="text-align:center; background:#fbb;"
| 12 || April 14 || @ Rays || 4–3 (10) || Farnsworth (1–0) || Capps (1–1) || || 10,042 || 4–8
|- style="text-align:center; background:#fbb;"
| 13 || April 15 || @ Rays || 5–2 || Davis (1–2) || Blackburn (1–2) || Farnsworth (3) || 15,342 || 4–9
|- style="text-align:center; background:#fbb;"
| 14 || April 16 || @ Rays || 4–3 || Cruz (1–0) || Nathan (0–1) || || 16,428 || 4–10 
|- style="text-align:center; background:#bfb;"
| 15 || April 17 || @ Rays || 4–2 || Duensing (1–0) || Hellickson (1–2) || Capps (1) || 22,426 || 5–10
|- style="text-align:center; background:#bfb;"
| 16 || April 18 || @ Orioles || 5 – 3 || Liriano (1–3) || Tillman (0–2) || Capps (2) || 13,138 || 6–10
|- style="text-align:center; background:#fbb;"
| 17 || April 19 || @ Orioles || 11–0 || Arrieta (2–1) || Pavano (1–2) || || 12,045 || 6–11
|- style="text-align:center; background:#fbb;"
| 18 || April 20 || @ Orioles || 5–4 || Britton (3–1)|| Blackburn (1–3) || Gregg (2) || 13,825 || 6–12
|- style="text-align:center; background:#bfb;"
| 19 || April 21 || @ Orioles || 3–1 || Baker (1–2) || Guthrie (1–3) || Capps (3) || 16,769 || 7–12
|- style="text-align:center; background:#bbb;"
|    || April 22 || Indians || colspan=6 | Postponed (rain); Makeup: 7/18
|- style="text-align:center; background:#bfb;"
| 20 || April 23 || Indians || 10–3 || Duensing (2–0) || Carmona (1–3) || || 39,459 || 8–12
|- style="text-align:center; background:#bfb;"
| 21 || April 24 || Indians || 4–3 || Pavano (2–2) || Pérez (2–1) || Capps (4) || 39,388 || 9–12
|- style="text-align:center; background:#bbb;"
|    || April 26 || Rays || colspan=6 | Postponed (rain); Makeup: 4/28
|- style="text-align:center; background:#fbb;"
| 22 || April 27 || Rays || 8–3 || Davis (3–2) || Liriano (1–4) || || 36,714 || 9–13
|- style="text-align:center; background:#fbb;"
| 23 || April 28 || Rays || 15–3 || Hellickson (2–2) || Blackburn (1–4) || || 38,215 || 9–14
|- style="text-align:center; background:#fbb;"
| 24 || April 28 || Rays || 6–1 || Niemann (1–3) || Swarzak (0–1) || || 36,456|| 9–15
|- style="text-align:center; background:#fbb;"
| 25 || April 29 || @ Royals || 4–3 || Wood (1–0) || Burnett (0–1) || Soria (6) || 31,407 || 9–16
|- style="text-align:center; background:#fbb;"
| 26 || April 30 || @ Royals || 11–2 || Adcock (1–0) || Duensing (2–1) || || 22,099 || 9–17
|-

|- style="text-align:center; background:#fbb;"
| 27 || May 1 || @ Royals || 10–3  || Hochevar (3–3)  || Pavano (2–3) || || 18,108 || 9–18
|- style="text-align:center; background:#bfb;"
| 28 || May 3 || @ White Sox || 1–0 || Liriano† (2–4) || Jackson (2–4) || || 20,901 || 10–18
|- style="text-align:center; background:#bfb;"
| 29 || May 4 || @ White Sox || 3–2 || Blackburn (2–4) || Danks (0–5) || Capps (5) || 18,028 || 11–18
|- style="text-align:center; background:#bfb;"
| 30 || May 6 || @ Red Sox || 9–2 || Baker (2–2) || Wakefield (0–1) || || 37,798 || 12–18
|- style="text-align:center; background:#fbb;"
| 31 || May 7 || @ Red Sox || 4–0 || Buchholz (3–3) || Duensing (2–2) || || 37,234 || 12–19
|- style="text-align:center; background:#fbb;"
| 32 || May 8 || @ Red Sox || 9–5 || Matsuzaka (3–3) || Pavano (2–4) || || 37,526 || 12–20
|- style="text-align:center; background:#fbb;"
| 33 || May 9 || @ Red Sox || 2–1 || Okajima (1–0) || Hoey (0–1) || || 37,276 || 12–21
|- style="text-align:center; background:#fbb;"
| 34 || May 10 || Tigers || 10–2 || Porcello (3–2) || Liriano (2–5) || || 38,949 || 12–22
|- style="text-align:center; background:#fbb;"
| 35 || May 11 || Tigers || 9–7 || Benoit (1–2) || Capps (1–2) || Valverde (8) || 38,938 || 12–23
|- style="text-align:center; background:#fbb;"
| 36 || May 13 || Blue Jays || 2–0 || Romero (3–4) || Burnett (0–2)  || Francisco (3) || 38,809 || 12–24
|- style="text-align:center; background:#fbb;"
| 37 || May 14 || Blue Jays || 9–3 (11) || Rauch (2–2) || Perkins (0–1) || || 39,934 || 12–25
|- style="text-align:center; background:#fbb;"
| 38 || May 15 || Blue Jays || 11–3 || Morrow (2–2) || Duensing (2–3) || || 39,301 || 12–26
|- style="text-align:center; background:#fbb;"
| 39 || May 16 || @ Mariners || 5–2 || Pineda (5–2) || Baker (2–3) || || 14,859 || 12–27
|- style="text-align:center; background:#bfb;"
| 40 || May 17 || @ Mariners || 2–1 || Liriano (3–5) || Hernández (4–4) || Capps (6) || 16,015 || 13–27
|- style="text-align:center; background:#bfb;"
| 41 || May 18 || @ Athletics || 4–3 (10) || Nathan (1–1) || Fuentes (1–4)  || Capps (7) || 15,355 || 14–27
|- style="text-align:center; background:#bfb;"
| 42 || May 19 || @ Athletics || 11–1 || Blackburn (3–4) || Ross (3–3) || || 22,320 || 15–27
|- style="text-align:center; background:#fbb;"
| 43 || May 20 || @ Diamondbacks || 8–7 || Kennedy (5–1) || Duensing (2–4) || Paterson (1) || 27,450 || 15–28
|- style="text-align:center; background:#fbb;"
| 44 || May 21 || @ Diamondbacks || 9–6 || Heilman (3–0) || Capps (1–3) || Putz (11) || 39,776 || 15–29
|- style="text-align:center; background:#fbb;"
| 45 || May 22 || @ Diamondbacks || 3–2 || Hudson (5–5) || Burnett (0–3) || Putz (12) || 31,017 || 15–30
|- style="text-align:center; background:#fbb;"
| 46 || May 23 || Mariners || 8–7 (10) || Wright (1–1) || Swarzak (0–2) || League (11) || 37,498 || 15–31
|- style="text-align:center; background:#bfb;"
| 47 || May 24 || Mariners || 4–2 || Blackburn (4–4) || Fister (2–5) || || 37,691 || 16–31
|- style="text-align:center; background:#fbb;"
| 48 || May 25 || Mariners || 3–0 || Bédard (3–4) || Duensing (2–5) || League (12) || 38,860 || 16–32
|- style="text-align:center; background:#fbb;"
| 49 || May 27 || Angels || 6–5 || Downs (3–1) || Hoey (0–2) ||Walden (11) || 38,976 || 16–33
|- style="text-align:center; background:#bfb;"
| 50 || May 28 || Angels || 1–0 (10) || Burnett (1–3) || Takahashi (1–1) || || 39,824 || 17–33
|- style="text-align:center; background:#fbb;"
| 51 || May 29 || Angels || 6–5 || Haren (5–3) || Pavano (2–5) || Walden (12) || 39,867 || 17–34
|- style="text-align:center; background:#fbb;"
| 52 || May 30 || @ Tigers || 6–5 || Alburquerque  (2–1) || Burnett (1–4) || Valverde (13) || 30,198 || 17–35
|- style="text-align:center; background:#fbb;"
| 53 || May 31 || @ Tigers || 8–7 || Alburquerque  (3–1) || Dumatrait (0–1) || Benoit (2) || 22,649 || 17-36
|-

|- style="text-align:center; background:#fbb;"
| 54 || June 1 || @ Tigers || 4–2 || Porcello (5–3) || Baker (2–4) || Valverde (14) || 24,363 || 17–37
|- style="text-align:center; background:#bfb;"
| 55 || June 2 || @ Royals || 8–2 || Swarzak (1–2)|| O'Sullivan (2–5) || || 14,584 || 18–37 
|- style="text-align:center; background:#bfb;"
| 56 || June 3 || @ Royals || 5–2 || Pavano (3–5) || Duffy (0–1) || || 32,443 || 19–37
|- style="text-align:center; background:#bfb;"
| 57 || June 4 || @ Royals || 7–2 || Blackburn (5–4) || Hochevar (3–6) || || 27,861 || 20–37
|- style="text-align:center; background:#bfb;"
| 58 || June 5 || @ Royals || 6–0 || Duensing (3–5) || Francis (2–6) || || 21,704 || 21–37
|- style="text-align:center; background:#bfb;"
| 59 || June 6 || @ Indians || 6–4 || Baker (3–4) || Tomlin (7–3) || Capps (8) || 15,278 || 22–37
|- style="text-align:center; background:#fbb;"
| 60 || June 7 || @ Indians || 1–0 || Carrasco (5–3) || Liriano (3–6) || C. Perez (15) || 15,498 || 22–38
|- style="text-align:center; background:#bfb;"
| 61 || June 8 || @ Indians || 3–2 (10) || Capps (2–3) || C. Perez (2–2) || Dumatrait (1) || 15,849 || 23–38
|- style="text-align:center; background:#bfb;"
| 62 || June 9 || Rangers || 5–4 || Hoey (1–2) || Lowe (1–1) || || 38,761 || 24–38
|- style="text-align:center; background:#fbb;"
| 63 || June 10 || Rangers || 9–3 || Wilson (7–3) || Duensing (3–6) || || 38,907 || 24–39
|- style="text-align:center; background:#bfb;"
| 64 || June 11 || Rangers || 8–1 || Baker (4–4) || Lewis (5–7) || || 40,420 || 25–39
|- style="text-align:center; background:#bfb;"
| 65 || June 12 || Rangers || 6–1 || Liriano (4–6) || Harrison (5–6) || || 39,281 || 26–39
|- style="text-align:center; background:#bbb;"
|  || June 14 || White Sox || colspan=6 | Postponed (rain); Makeup: 9/5
|- style="text-align:center; background:#bfb;"
| 66 || June 15 || White Sox || 4–1 || Pavano (4–5) || Floyd (6–6) || || 37,437 || 27–39
|- style="text-align:center; background:#bfb;"
| 67 || June 16 || White Sox || 1–0 || Blackburn (6–4) || Buehrle (6–5) || Capps (9) || 39,484 || 28–39
|- style="text-align:center; background:#bfb;"
| 68 || June 17 || Padres || 6–5 || Duensing (4–6) || Richard (2–9) || Capps (10) || 39,205 || 29–39
|- style="text-align:center; background:#bfb;"
| 69 || June 18 || Padres || 1–0 || Baker (5–4) || Stauffer (2–5) || Capps (11) || 40,225 || 30–39
|- style="text-align:center; background:#bfb;"
| 70 || June 19 || Padres || 5–4 || Burnett (2–4) || Qualls (3–3) || || 40,655 || 31–39
|- style="text-align:center; background: #bfb"
| 71 || June 21 || @ Giants || 9–2 || Pavano (5–5)  || Bumgarner (3–9) || || 41,958 || 32–39
|- style="text-align:center; background:#fbb;"
| 72 || June 22 || @ Giants || 5–1 || Vogelsong (5–1) || Blackburn (6–5) || || 41,886 || 32–40
|- style="text-align:center; background:#fbb;"
| 73 || June 23 || @ Giants || 2–1 || Lincecum (6–6) || Duensing (4–7) || Wilson (21) || 42,481 || 32–41 
|- style="text-align:center; background:#fbb;"
| 74 || June 24 || @ Brewers || 4–3 || Wolf (6–4) || Baker (5–5) || Axford (20) || 39,819 || 32–42
|- style="text-align:center; background:#fbb;"
| 75 || June 25 || @ Brewers || 11–1 || Gallardo (9–4) || Liriano (4–7) || || 43,980 || 32–43
|- style="text-align:center; background:#fbb;"
| 76 || June 26 || @ Brewers || 6–2 || Narveson (5–5) || Pavano (5–6) || || 41,624 || 32–44
|- style="text-align:center; background:#fbb;"
| 77 || June 27 || Dodgers || 15–0 || Billingsley (7–6) || Blackburn (6–6) || || 39,487 || 32–45
|- style="text-align:center; background:#bfb;"
| 78 || June 28 || Dodgers || 6–4 || Duensing (5–7) || Lilly (5–8) || Capps (12) || 39,755 || 33–45
|- style="text-align:center; background:#bfb;"
| 79 || June 29 || Dodgers || 1–0 || Baker (6–5) || De La Rosa (3–3) || Capps (13) || 39,655 || 34–45
|-

|- style="text-align:center; background:#bfb;"
| 80 || July 1 || Brewers || 6–4 || Liriano (5–7) || Gallardo (9–5) || || 40,812 || 35–45
|- style="text-align:center; background:#fbb;"
| 81 || July 2 || Brewers || 8–7 || Saito (1–1) || Capps (2–4) || Axford (21) || 41,378 || 35–46
|- style="text-align:center; background:#bfb;"
| 82 || July 3 || Brewers || 9–7 || Dumatrait (1–1) || Loe (2–7) || Perkins (1) || 41,195 || 36–46
|- style="text-align:center; background:#bfb;"
| 83 || July 4 || Rays || 7–0 || Duensing (6–7) || Price (8–7) || || 39,528 || 37–46
|- style="text-align:center; background:#bfb;"
| 84 || July 5 || Rays || 3–2 || Baker (7–5) || Shields (8–6) || Perkins (2) || 38,613 || 38–46
|- style="text-align:center; background:#fbb;"
| 85 || July 6 || Rays || 12–5 || Howell (2–1) || Burnett (2–5) || || 39,841 || 38–47
|- style="text-align:center; background:#bfb;"
| 86 || July 7 || @ White Sox || 6–2 || Pavano (6–6)|| Humber (8–5) || || 26,395 || 39–47
|- style="text-align:center; background:#bfb;"
| 87 || July 8 || @ White Sox || 8–5 || Blackburn (7–6) || Floyd (6–9) || Capps (14) || 27,737 || 40–47
|- style="text-align:center; background:#fbb;"
| 88 || July 9 || @ White Sox || 4–3 || Crain (5–2) || Mijares (0–1) || || 30,055 || 40–48
|- style="text-align:center; background:#bfb;"
| 89 || July 10 || @ White Sox || 6–3 || Swarzak (2–2) || Peavy (4–3) || Capps (15) || 30,042 || 41–48
|-  style="text-align:center; background:#bbb;"
| colspan="9"  | All-Star Break: National League defeats American League 5–1.
|- style="text-align:center; background:#bfb;"
| 90 || July 14 || Royals || 8–4 || Liriano (6–7) || Chen (5–3) || || 39,584 || 42–48
|- style="text-align:center; background:#fbb;"
| 91 || July 15 || Royals || 2–1 || Collins (4–4) || Capps (2–5) || Soria (16) || 39,177 || 42–49
|- style="text-align:center; background:#bfb;"
| 92 || July 16 || Royals || 4–3 || Perkins (1–1) || Francis (3–11) || Nathan (4) || 41,295 || 43–49
|- style="text-align:center; background:#bfb;"
| 93 || July 17 || Royals || 4–3 || Duensing (7–7) || Paulino (1–3) || Nathan (5) || 38,786 || 44–49
|- style="text-align:center; background:#fbb;"
| 94 || July 18 || Indians || 5–2 || Huff (1–0) || Swarzak (2–3) || Pestano (2) || 39,768 || 44–50
|- style="text-align:center; background:#fbb;"
| 95 || July 18 || Indians || 6–3 || Carmona (5–10) || Diamond (0–1)  || || 38,491 || 44–51
|- style="text-align:center; background:#bfb;"
| 96 || July 19 || Indians || 2–1 || Perkins (2–1) || Perez (2–5) || || 38,473 || 45–51
|- style="text-align:center; background:#bfb;"
| 97 || July 20 || Indians || 7–5 || Capps (3–5) || Sipp (4–2) || Nathan (6) || 39,167 || 46–51
|- style="text-align:center; background:#fbb;"
| 98 || July 21 || Tigers || 6–2 || Verlander (13–5) || Pavano (6–7) || || 40,149 || 46–52
|- style="text-align:center; background:#fbb;"
| 99 || July 22 || Tigers || 8–2 || Scherzer (11–5) || Duensing (7–8) || || 40,691 || 46–53
|- style="text-align:center; background:#bfb;"
| 100 || July 23 || Tigers || 4–1 || Baker (8–5) || Penny (7–7) || Nathan (7) || 40,764 || 47–53
|- style="text-align:center; background:#fbb;"
| 101 || July 24 || Tigers || 5–2 || Porcello (10–6) || Liriano (6–8) || Valverde (26) || 40,789 || 47–54
|- style="text-align:center; background:#fbb;"
| 102 || July 25 || @ Rangers || 20–6 || Holland (9–4) || Blackburn (7–7) || || 35,573 || 47–55
|- style="text-align:center; background:#bfb;"
| 103 || July 26 || @ Rangers || 9–8 || Perkins (3–1) || Feliz (0–2) || Nathan (8) || 30,581 || 48–55
|- style="text-align:center; background:#bfb;"
| 104 || July 27 || @ Rangers || 7–2 || Duensing (8–8) || Lewis (10–8) || || 35,950 || 49–55
|- style="text-align:center; background:#fbb;"
| 105 || July 28 || @ Rangers || 4–1 || Harrison (9–7) || Baker (8–6) || Feliz (21) || 30,406 || 49–56
|- style="text-align:center; background:#bfb;"
| 106 || July 29 || @ Athletics || 9–5 || Liriano (7–8) || Gonzalez (9–8) || || 25,656 || 50–56
|- style="text-align:center; background:#fbb;"
| 107 || July 30 || @ Athletics || 8–3 || Moscoso (4–5) || Blackburn (7–8) || || 19,605 || 50–57
|- style="text-align:center; background:#fbb;"
| 108 || July 31 || @ Athletics || 7–3 || McCarthy (4–5) || Pavano (6–8) || || 22,452 || 50–58
|-

|- style="text-align:center; background:#fbb;"
| 109 || August 2 || @ Angels || 5–1 || Santana (7–8) || Duensing (8–9) || || 37,565 || 50–59
|- style="text-align:center; background:#bfb;"
| 110 || August 3 || @ Angels || 11–4 || Swarzak (3–3) || Piñeiro (5–6) || || 35,555 || 51–59
|- style="text-align:center; background:#fbb;"
| 111 || August 4 || @ Angels || 7–1 || Haren (12–6) || Liriano (7–9) || || 40,365 || 51–60
|- style="text-align:center; background:#fbb;"
| 112 || August 5 || White Sox || 5–3 || Buehrle (9–5) || Blackburn (7–9) || Sale (3) || 41,364 || 51–61
|- style="text-align:center; background:#fbb;"
| 113 || August 6 || White Sox || 6–1 || Stewart (1–1) || Pavano (6–9) || || 41,030 || 51–62
|- style="text-align:center; background:#fbb;"
| 114 || August 7 || White Sox || 7–0 || Peavy (5–5) || Duensing (8–v10) || || 39,353 || 51–63
|- style="text-align:center; background:#fbb;"
| 115 || August 8 || Red Sox || 8–6 || Aceves (8–1) || Perkins (3–2) || Papelbon (25)  || 40,080 || 51–64
|- style="text-align:center; background:#fbb;"
| 116 || August 9 || Red Sox || 4–3 || Albers (4–3) || Capps (3–6) || Papelbon (26) || 39,974 || 51–65
|- style="text-align:center; background:#bfb;"
| 117 || August 10 || Red Sox || 5–2 || Perkins (4–2) || Lester (11–6) || Nathan (9) || 40,491 || 52–65
|- style="text-align:center; background:#fbb;"
| 118 || August 12 || @ Indians || 3–2 || R. Perez (5–2) || Perkins (4–3) || C. Perez (24) || 31,364 || 52–66
|- style="text-align:center; background:#fbb;"
| 119 || August 13 || @ Indians || 3–1 || Tomlin (12–5) || Duensing (8–11) || C. Perez (25) || 30,619 || 52–67
|- style="text-align:center; background:#bbb;"
| || August 14 || @ Indians || colspan=6 | Postponed (rain); Makeup: 9/24
|- style="text-align:center; background:#bfb;"
| 120 || August 15 || @ Tigers || 9–6 || Liriano (8–9) || Porcello (11–8) || Nathan (10) || 36,211 || 53–67
|- style="text-align:center; background:#fbb;"
| 121 || August 16 || @ Tigers || 7–1 || Verlander (18–5) || Blackburn (7–10) || || 40,589 || 53–68
|- style="text-align:center; background:#bfb;"
| 122 || August 17 || @ Tigers || 6–5 || Capps (4–6) || Valverde (2–4) || Nathan (11) || 34,835 || 54–68
|- style="text-align:center; background:#fbb;"
| 123 || August 18 || Yankees || 8–4 || Sabathia (17–7) || Duensing (8–12) || || 41,126 || 54–69
|- style="text-align:center; background:#fbb;"
| 124 || August 19 || Yankees || 8–1 || Hughes (4–4) || Slowey (0–1) || || 41,328 || 54–70
|- style="text-align:center; background:#bfb;"
| 125 || August 20 || Yankees || 9–4 || Liriano (9–9) || Burnett (9–10) || || 41,254 || 55–70
|- style="text-align:center; background:#fbb;"
| 126 || August 21 || Yankees || 3–0 || Nova (13–4) || Dumatrait (1–2) || Rivera (33) || 41,242 || 55–71
|- style="text-align:center; background:#fbb;"
| 127 || August 22 || Orioles || 4–1 || Britton (7–9) || Pavano (6–10) || Gregg (18) || 38,986 || 55–72
|- style="text-align:center; background:#fbb;"
| 128 || August 23 || Orioles || 8–1 || Simón (4–6) || Duensing (8–13) || || 38,786 || 55–73
|- style="text-align:center; background:#fbb;"
| 129 || August 24 || Orioles || 6–1 || Guthrie (6–16) || Slowey (0–2) || || 37,778 || 55–74
|- style="text-align:center; background:#fbb;"
| 130 || August 25 || Orioles || 6–1 || Reyes (7–10) || Swarzak (3–4) || || 38,406 || 55–75
|- style="text-align:center; background:#fbb;"
| 131 || August 26 || Tigers || 8–1 || Porcello (12–8) || Diamond (0–2) || || 38,918 || 55–76
|- style="text-align:center; background:#fbb;"
| 132 || August 27 || Tigers || 6–4 || Verlander (20–5) || Pavano (6–11) || Valverde (39) || 40,179 || 55–77
|- style="text-align:center; background:#bfb;"
| 133 || August 28 || Tigers || 11–4 || Duensing (9–13) || Penny (9–10) || || 39,130 || 56–77
|- style="text-align:center; background:#fbb;"
| 134 || August 29 || @ White Sox || 3–0 || Buehrle (11–6) || Slowey (0–3) || Santos (27) || 24,120 || 56–78
|- style="text-align:center; background:#fbb;"
| 135 || August 30 || @ White Sox || 8–6 || Ohman (1–3) || Swarzak (3–5) || Santos (28) || 21,632 || 56–79
|- style="text-align:center; background:#bfb;"
| 136 || August 31 || @ White Sox || 7–6 || Diamond (1–2) || Peavy (6–7) || Nathan (12) || 20,346 || 57–79
|-

|- style="text-align:center; background:#bfb;"
| 137 || September 2 || @ Angels || 13–5 || Pavano (7–11) || Chatwood (6–10) || || 37,198 || 58–79
|- style="text-align:center; background:#fbb;"
| 138 || September 3 || @ Angels || 10–6 || Weaver (16–7) || Dumatrait (1–3) || || 39,102 || 58–80
|- style="text-align:center; background:#fbb;"
| 139 || September 4 || @ Angels || 4–1 || Piñeiro (6–6) || Slowey (0–4) || Walden (28) || 36,638 || 58–81
|- style="text-align:center; background:#fbb;"
| 140 || September 5 || White Sox || 2–1 || Humber (9–8) || Swarzak (3–6) || Sale (6) || 40,252 || 58–82
|- style="text-align:center; background:#fbb;"
| 141 || September 5 || White Sox || 4–0 || Stewart (2–3) || Diamond (1–3) || || 39,849 || 58–83
|- style="text-align:center; background:#fbb;"
| 142 || September 6 || White Sox || 3–0 || Peavy (7–7) || Hendriks (0–1) || Santos (29) || 36,959 || 58–84
|- style="text-align:center; background:#bfb;"
| 143 || September 7 || White Sox || 5–4 || Pavano (8–11) || Danks (6–11) || Nathan (13) || 38,359 || 59–84
|- style="text-align:center; background:#fbb;"
| 144 || September 9 || @ Tigers || 8–4 || Penny (10–10) || Slowey (0–5) || || 35,996 || 59–85
|- style="text-align:center; background:#fbb;"
| 145 || September 10 || @ Tigers || 3–2 || Alburquerque (6–1) || Perkins (4–4) || || 38,567 || 59–86
|- style="text-align:center; background:#fbb;"
| 146 || September 11 || @ Tigers || 2–1 || Fister (8–13) || Diamond (1–4) || Valverde (43) || 36,972 || 59–87
|- style="text-align:center; background:#fbb;"
| 147 || September 13 || @ Royals || 4–0 || Chen (11–7) || Pavano (8–12) || || 25,253 || 59–88
|- style="text-align:center; background:#fbb;"
| 148 || September 14 || @ Royals || 7–3 || Hochevar (11–11) || Hendriks (0–2) || Holland (3) || 19,076 || 59–89
|- style="text-align:center; background:#fbb;"
| 149 || September 16 || Indians || 7–6 || Jiménez (4–2) || Slowey (0–6) || C. Perez (33) || 37,942 || 59–90
|- style="text-align:center; background:#fbb;"
| 150 || September 17 || Indians || 10–4 || Gómez (4–2) || Swarzak (3–7) || || 38,805 || 59–91
|- style="text-align:center; background:#fbb;"
| 151 || September 18 || Indians || 6–5 || Masterson (12–10) || Pavano (8–13) || C. Perez (34) || 37,012 || 59–92
|- style="text-align:center; background:#fbb;"
| 152 || September 19 || @ Yankees || 6–4 || Wade (6–1) || Diamond (1–5) || Rivera (43) || 40,045 || 59–93
|- style="text-align:center; background:#fbb;"
| 153 || September 20 || Mariners || 5–4 || Vargas (9–13) || Duensing (9–14) || League (35) || 35,995 || 59–94
|- style="text-align:center; background:#fbb;"
| 154 || September 21 || Mariners || 5–4 || Jimenez (1–0) || Slowey (0–7) || League (36) || 36,263 || 59–95
|- style="text-align:center; background:#bfb;"
| 155 || September 22 || Mariners || 3–2 || Nathan (2–1) || Delabar (1–1) || || 37,466 || 60–95
|- style="text-align:center; background:#fbb;"
| 156 || September 23 || @ Indians || 6–5 || C. Perez (4–7) || Capps (4–7) || || 36,807 || 60–96
|- style="text-align:center; background:#fbb;"
| 157 || September 24 || @ Indians || 8–2 || Putnam (1–1) || Liriano (9–10) || || 26,197 || 60–97
|- style="text-align:center; background:#fbb;"
| 158 || September 24 || @ Indians || 7–6 || Hagadone (1–0) || Mijares (0–2) || || 30,748 || 60–98
|- style="text-align:center; background:#bfb;"
| 159 || September 25 || @ Indians || 6–4 (10) || Waldrop (1–0) || Sipp (6–3) || || 22,539 || 61–98
|- style="text-align:center; background:#fbb;"
| 160 || September 26 || Royals || 7–3 || Paulino (4–10) || Slowey (0–8) || || 34,847 || 61–99
|- style="text-align:center; background:#bfb;"
| 161 || September 27 || Royals || 7–4 || Swarzak (4–7) || O'Sullivan (2–6) || || 34,228 || 62–99
|- style="text-align:center; background:#bfb;"
| 162 || September 28 || Royals || 1–0 || Pavano (9–13) || Wood (5–3) || || 36,488 || 63–99
|-

Player stats

Batting
Note: G = Games played; AB = At bats; R = Runs scored; H = Hits; 2B = Doubles; 3B = Triples; HR = Home runs; RBI = Runs batted in; AVG = Batting average; SB = Stolen bases

Pitching
Note: W = Wins; L = Losses; ERA = Earned run average; G = Games pitched; GS = Games started; SV = Saves; IP = Innings pitched; R = Runs allowed; ER = Earned runs allowed; BB = Walks allowed; K = Strikeouts

Other post-season awards
Calvin R. Griffith Award (Most Valuable Twin) – Michael Cuddyer
Joseph W. Haynes Award (Twins Pitcher of the Year) – Glen Perkins
Bill Boni Award (Twins Outstanding Rookie) – Ben Revere
Charles O. Johnson Award (Most Improved Twin) – Glen Perkins
Dick Siebert Award (Upper Midwest Player of the Year) – Jeremy Hellickson
Bob Allison Award (Leadership Award) – Michael Cuddyer
Mike Augustin Award ("Media Good Guy" Award) – Michael Cuddyer
The above awards are voted on by the Twin Cities chapter of the BBWAA
Carl R. Pohlad Award (Outstanding Community Service) – Carl Pavano
Sherry Robertson Award (Twins Outstanding Farm System Position Player) – Brian Dozier
Jim Rantz Award (Twins Outstanding Farm System Pitcher) – Liam Hendriks
Kirby Puckett Award (Alumni Community Service) – Terry Steinbach
Herb Carneal Award (Lifetime Achievement Award) – John Gordon

Farm system

References

2011 Minnesota Twins at Baseball Reference

Minnesota Twins seasons
Minnesota Twins
2011 in sports in Minnesota